The following is a list of notable events and releases that occurred in 2010 in mainland European music.

Events

January – March
February 12 – Jesper Strömblad quits In Flames.
March 29 – Protesters interrupt a concert by the Jerusalem Quartet at London's Wigmore Hall.

April – June
May 8–9 – Collective premiere of the 21 works of the Klang cycle by Karlheinz Stockhausen takes place in Cologne, Germany, by members of musikFabrik and others, in 176 individual concerts, as part of the MusikTriennale Köln.
May 18 – The 2010 World Music Awards ceremony is held in Monte Carlo, Monaco.  Guest performers include Andrea Bocelli and Tiziano Ferro.
May 29 – The Final of the 55th annual Eurovision Song Contest takes place in Oslo, Norway. It is won by 19-year-old singer Lena Meyer-Landrut, singing Satellite and representing Germany.
 Rock in Rio Festival returns to Lisboa, Portugal and Madrid, Spain.

July – September
Toto temporarily reform for a short tour through Europe in honor of their former bassist Mike Porcaro, who suffers from ALS.
July 24 – The last Loveparade took place in  Duisburg implying the deaths of 21 people.

October – December
December 4 – Norwegian group A-ha break up with a concert in Oslo at the end of a world tour.

Groups reformed 
 WIZO
 Sôber
 Atari Teenage Riot

Groups disbanded 
 A-ha
 Scorpions
 Turbonegro

Albums set to be released

January 

January 20
Waiting For the Bells by Joel Alme

Unspecific date
Sons of the System by Mnemic

February 
8
The Underworld Regime by Ov Hell
February 9
Screamworks: Love in Theory and Practice, Chapters 1–13 by HIM

February 19
Grosse Freiheit by Unheilig

February 23
Work by Shout Out Louds

February 24
We Are The Void by Dark Tranquility

March
8
Belus by Burzum

15
The Longest Year by Katatonia

April
7
Threnody by Engel

April 9
Vom Vintage verweht by Dendemann

21
Road Kill by The Haunted

July
2
The Panic Broadcast by Soilwork

July 13
Excavations of the Mind by Sky Architect

20
The Sledgehammer Files: The Best of Soilwork 1998-2008 by Soilwork

September 
20
In Live Concert at the Royal Albert Hall by Opeth

22
Abrahadabra by Dimmu Borgir

September 27
Fall from Grace by Infernal

28
A Thin Shell by October Tide

Unspecified date 
Blood of the Nations by Accept
Untitled by Blind Guardian
Untitled by Blindside
Henzi by Kraftwerk
Sting in the Tail by Scorpions
Untitled by Valkyrja
Untitled by WIZO
Untitled by Lena Katina
The Seven Temptations by Doda
Untitled by Anna Vissi

Musical films 
Chico and Rita, animation with music by Bebo Valdés (Spain/UK)
Gainsbourg: A Heroic Life, biopic of Serge Gainsbourg starring Eric Elmosnino (France)
Konferenz der Tiere, animation with music by David Newman (Germany)
Winx Club 3D: Magical Adventure, animation with music by Paolo Baglio (Italy)
Zeiten ändern dich, starring German rapper Bushido, and based on his autobiography (Germany) (Germany)

Classical 
 Hans Werner Henze – Der Opfergang, for choir
 Magnus Lindberg – Al largo for orchestra
 Wolfgang Rihm – Gegenstück for bass saxophon, percussion and piano (revised version)

Deaths 
 March 10 – Peter Van Wood, 82, Dutch guitarist, singer, songwriter, actor and astrologer.
 March 16 – Ksenija Pajčin, 32, Serbian singer.
 June 3 –  Elodie Lauten, French-American composer and educator, 63
 June 10 – Rock-Olga (Birgit Magnusson), 70, Swedish rock singer.
 August 20 – Charles Haddon, 22, Lead singer of British synthpop/electropop group 'Ou est le swimming pool'.
 December 30 – Bobby Farrell, 61, Frontman of Boney M.

See also 
 2010s in music

References 

Music
European